, also known as Nakayama Hiromichi, was a Japanese martial artist and founder of the iaidō style Musō Shinden-ryū.  Received hanshi (master instructor) ranks in kendō, iaidō, and jōdō from the All Japan Kendo Federation. In addition, he held an instructor's license in Shintō Musō-ryū and a Menkyo kaiden in Shindō Munen-ryū making him the 7th sōke of that system. Nakayama was also one of the masters of the Shimomura-ha Musō Shinden Eishin-ryū, iaijutsu.

Biography 
Nakayama was born in 1872 in Kanazawa City, Ishikawa Prefecture, Japan. He moved to Tokyo when he was 19 years old and entered the dōjō of Negishi Shingorō of the Shindō Munen-ryū. In time, Nakayama became a master of Shindō Munen-ryū kenjutsu. 

He taught at the Yushinkan Dojo, near Koishikawa-Kōrakuen in Tokyo, and he trained many of the top swordsmen of his day. He was a personal friend of aikido founder Morihei Ueshiba, and he was instrumental in arranging the marriage between his student Kiyoshi Nakakura and Ueshiba's daughter, Matsuko. He also was the teacher of Ueshiba's student Minoru Mochizuki, developer of the Yoseikan dojo. Nakayama also taught kendo and Iaido to Gigō Funakoshi, third son of Shotokan karate founder Gichin Funakoshi, who gave his father´s karate a more Japanese flavour by adding kendo and Iaido based training exercises and technical improvements based on his swordsmanship training.

By the mid-1920s, Nakayama was one of the most famous swordsmen in Japan, and as such, he was made a leader of the committee that drew up the sword curriculum for the Toyama Military Academy. Therefore, he is considered by many to be the father of Toyama swordsmanship. Nonetheless, Kimura Shoji wrote in 1926:

 

Nakayama was an active promoter of New Swords (e.g., modern swords made in the traditional fashion). Often, this involved cutting demonstrations. For example, on July 10, 1934, Nakayama publicly demonstrated the strength of New Swords by using one to cut an iron bar about the thickness of a man's finger. The bar had been wrapped in straw, and Nakayama cut it with a single stroke, without leaving a mark on either the table or the blade. The Japanese Sword Institute had forged the sword; the smiths were students of Kurishara Hikosaburo. Unfortunately, such high quality swords were too expensive for mass production. In 1941, New Swords typically cost ¥2,000-¥8,000 (US $1,000-$4,000).

At the end of World War II, Nakayama was quick to advise Japanese people to greet Allied troops with grace, saying samurai never mouthed what was finished. Said he:

 

 

Nakayama lived this advice himself, and as such, he was involved in the establishment of the postwar All Japan Kendo Federation and titled as Meijin by the International Martial Arts Federation (IMAF Japan). 

Nakayama was also a poet and calligrapher. A sample scroll reads:

 Flowers need water and shade
 Bamboo needs the moon shade
 Beautiful woman looks best through the shade of a screen

Publications 

 (剣道手引草).

References

External links
 Kendo World forum - thread about life of Nakayama Hakudo
 

1872 births
1958 deaths
Sportspeople from Ishikawa Prefecture
Japanese kendoka
Japanese swordfighters
Japanese jojutsuka
Shindō Munen-ryū
People from Kanazawa, Ishikawa
Iaidoka